Andrei Plekhanov (born 12 July 1986) is a Russian former professional ice hockey defenseman. Plekhanov was drafted by the Columbus Blue Jackets in the third round with the 96th overall pick in the 2004 NHL Entry Draft.

Playing career 
He then came over to North America and signed with the Columbus Blue Jackets, skating for the club's AHL affiliate the Syracuse Crunch and ECHL affiliate Elmira Jackals during the 2007–08 season. The young defenseman re-signed to a one-way deal with the Blue Jackets for the 2008–09 season and signed in October 2009 for HC Dynamo Moscow.

Career statistics

References

External links 
RussianProspects.com Andrei Plekhanov Profile

1986 births
Amur Khabarovsk players
Columbus Blue Jackets draft picks
HC Dynamo Moscow players
Elmira Jackals (ECHL) players
Idaho Steelheads (ECHL) players
Living people
HC Neftekhimik Nizhnekamsk players
Russian ice hockey defencemen
Sarnia Sting players
HC Sibir Novosibirsk players
HC Sochi players
Syracuse Crunch players